Taiska or Hannele Aulikki Kauppinen, née Suominen (born June 9, 1955 in Imatra) is a Finnish singer of popular music. She is mostly known for her evergreen hit, "Mombasa" (1975), originally by Italian composer Fabio Frizzi. She married Pekka Kauppinen in 1984, bore him a son named Elias, and divorced in 1990.

World Popular Song Festival 
In the World Popular Song Festival 1977, in Tokyo, Japan, she represented Finland with a Finnish-language song ("Boogie-mies"), with a score of 56 points.

Discography

Albums 
Mombasa (1976)
Taiska (1978)
Villi vapaudenkaipuu (1980)
Oma tie (1981)
20 suosikkia – Mombasa (1996)
20 suosikkia – Rannalla (2000)
Matkalla (2005)
Taiska – Hitit (2011)

References

1955 births
Living people
People from Imatra
20th-century Finnish women singers
21st-century Finnish women singers